Engineers Without Borders UK is a UK-based registered charity and NGO.

Formed in recognition of the fact that engineering is vital to successfully addressing complex challenges such as the effects of climate change, resource constraints, increasing urbanisation and a rapidly expanding global population, Engineers Without Borders UK works to change how engineering is perceived, taught and practiced.  The organisation aims to bring people, ideas and engineering together to respond to the world’s most pressing problems.

Description

Engineers Without Borders UK was started by a group of students at Cambridge University in 2001, at the original suggestion of Parker Mitchell (co-founder of EWB Canada) who was then doing an MPhil in Sustainable Development at the university. Sarah Hindle (Engineering undergraduate) and Richard Sargeant (Political Science undergraduate) were the first directors.

In 2002, Engineers Without Borders UK arranged its first overseas placement in Pondicherry, India, with an organisation called ORSED. The first large scale training course also took place in 2002 at Clare Farm outside Cambridge. The organisation was registered as a national charity in England and Wales in 2003 following groups set up at a number of other universities. The national office moved to London, where it is still based, in 2013.

Engineers Without Borders UK is a member of the Engineers Without Borders International (EWB-I) federation and sits on the Board and Executive Committee.

Engineers Without Borders UK is a registered charity in England & Wales (No. 1101849) and Scotland (No. SC043537) and is a company limited by guarantee (No. 04856607).

Its registered office is situated at The Foundry, 17 Oval Way, London, SE11 5RR, United Kingdom.

References

External links 

 Engineers Without Borders UK
 Engineers Without Borders International

UK
Development charities based in the United Kingdom
Engineering societies based in the United Kingdom
2001 establishments in the United Kingdom
Organizations established in 2001